The Copa Internacional Cafam is a football tournament that serves as a pre-season for Colombian teams. The whole tournament is played in Bogotá on late January. The tournament is organized by Millonarios and Caja de Compensacion Familiar (Cafam). All games are played in Estadio El Campín.

Results

All-time scorers
2 goals

  Léider Preciado (Santa Fe)
  Luis Tejada (América de Cali) (Millonarios)
  Avilés Hurtado (América de Cali)

1 goal

  Adrian Ramos (América de Cali)
  Ricardo Ciciliano (Millonarios)
  Martín García (Millonarios)
  Carlos Castillo (Millonarios)
  César Valoyes (Santa Fe)
  Luis Fernando Mosquera (Santa Fe)
  Jhon Valencia (América de Cali)
  Carlos Marinelli (Millonarios)
  Aldo Ramírez (Atlético Nacional)
  Jairo Palomino (Atlético Nacional)
  Matías Caruzzo (Argentinos Juniors)
  Duván Zapata (América de Cali)
  Óscar Rodas (Santa Fe)
  José Luis Tancredi (Millonarios)

Performances by team

References 

Colombian football friendly trophies